The rufous-vented yuhina (Yuhina occipitalis) is a bird species in the white-eye family Zosteropidae. It is found along the northern parts of the Indian subcontinent, primarily in the Eastern Himalayas, and ranges across Bhutan, India, Tibet, Myanmar, and Nepal. Its natural habitat is subtropical or tropical moist montane forests.

References

Collar, N. J. & Robson, C. 2007. Family Timaliidae (Babblers)  pp. 70 – 291 in; del Hoyo, J., Elliott, A. & Christie, D.A. eds. Handbook of the Birds of the World, Vol. 12. Picathartes to Tits and Chickadees. Lynx Edicions, Barcelona.

rufous-vented yuhina
Birds of Bhutan
Birds of Northeast India
Birds of Myanmar
Birds of Nepal
Birds of Yunnan
rufous-vented yuhina
Taxonomy articles created by Polbot